Lisa Savage (born c. 1976) is a Canadian curler.

Personal life
Savage attended Markham District High School. She is the daughter of 1983 Brier and World Champion, Paul Savage.

Teams and events

References

External links

Lisa Savage - Curling Canada Stats Archive
Lisa Savage Cards | Trading Card Database

1970s births
Living people
Canadian women curlers
Curlers from Ontario
World curling champions
Canadian women's curling champions